EE-Media is a C-pop (Mandopop) record label, founded in Shanghai, China in 2004 by Long Danni under the parent company Hunan Broadcasting System.

History
The company was created after the success of Super Girl and Super Boy, national singing contests organized by Hunan Satellite Television. Due to the success of the contests many of the contestants became idols and attracted many fans, which drew many investments for Hunan TV to create EE-Media, a subsidiary specifically to publish records and musical productions.

Locations
 Shanghai - Headquarters
 Beijing
 Haikou, Hainan
 Hong Kong SAR

Artists

Male
 Hua Chenyu
 Guo Jingming
 Amguulan
 Jason Zhang
 Vision Wei
 Yu Haoming
 Yu Menglong
 Zhang Xincheng
 Zhang Han
 Zhu Zixiao
 Wang Yuexin
 Su Xing
 Ji Jie
 Lu Hu
 Chai Ge
 Guo Biao
 Wang Zhengliang
 Yao Zheng
 Zhu Yan
 Zhong Zhuo
 Ping An
 Jia Hai (Henry)
 Lu Nuo
 Ou Hao

Female
 An Youqi
 Tan Weiwei
 Xu Fei
 Li Na
 Zhang Yafei
 Li Weiwei
 Tang Xiao
 Xia Ying
 Chen Xibei
 Ai Mengmeng
 Han Zhenzhen
 Hong Chen
 Tong Wejia
 Han Xiaoxiao
 Jin Wenxin
 Su Miaoling
 Cao Lu

Group
 Top Combine
 Strings
 Reborn Portfolio
 I Me
 8090

Super Girl 2009
 Wang Zhixin
 Chang Yu-fang
 Li Xiaoyun
 Liu Xijun
 Huang Ying
 Yu Kewei
 Jiang Yingrong
 Cheng Chen
 Li Yuanxi
 Pan Chen
 Tan Lina
 Liu Meihan
 Pan Hongyue
 Yang Zi
 Big Chunzi
 Tao Le
 Mo Chen

Former
 Zeng Yike (2009-2017)
 Zheng Shuang (2009-2015)
 Li Yuchun（2005-2015）
 He Jie (2005-2010)
 Pan Chen (2009)
 Chen Chusheng (2007-2009)
 Liu Liyang (2006-2007)
 Bibi Zhou (2005)
.

See also
 C-pop
 Super Girl
 Super Boy

References

External links
 www.eemedia.cn

Chinese record labels
Pop record labels